Foreign Devils is a 1927 American silent drama film directed by W. S. Van Dyke and starring Tim McCoy and Claire Windsor, which was released by MGM on September 3, 1927.

Plot
Captain Robert Kelly (McCoy) while attached to the American Embassy in Peking at the time of the Boxer Rebellion befriends Lady Patricia Rutledge (Windsor) and rescues her from the priests of a Chinese temple that she has gone to visit. He then asks a friend to escort her to safety and battles the Chinese in order to give them time to escape. Eventually he brings news or the approach of the Eight-Nation Alliance to the barricade.

Cast
 Tim McCoy as Capt. Robert Kelly
 Claire Windsor as Lady Patricia Rutledge
 Cyril Chadwick as Lord Vivien Cholmondely
 Frank Currier as U.S. Minister Conger
 Emily Fitzroy as Mrs. Conger
 Lawson Butt as Sir Claude
 Sôjin as Lama priest (as Sojin)
 Frank Chew as Prince Tuan

Crew
 Cedric Gibbons - Art Director
 David Townsend - Art Director
 René Hubert - Costume Design

References

External links
 
 
 Posters and stills at clairewindsor.weebly.com

1927 films
1927 drama films
Silent American drama films
American silent feature films
American black-and-white films
1920s English-language films
Films directed by W. S. Van Dyke
Metro-Goldwyn-Mayer films
Films set in Beijing
Films set in 1900
Films set in the Qing dynasty
1920s American films